The Santana 2023 is a family of American trailerable sailboats that was designed by Steve Schock, with models for racing and cruising, first built in 1993.

The Santana 2023 is a development of W. Shad Turner's  1978 Santana 23 D design, using the same hull design, but different deck, mast and interior.

Production
The design was built by W. D. Schock Corp in the United States from 1993 until 2001, but it is now out of production.

Design
The Santana 2023 is a recreational keelboat, built predominantly of fiberglass that was built in three different models: A, C and R.

All models have fractional rigs; raked stems; two-angled, open reverse transoms; transom-hung rudders controlled by a tiller and retractable centerboards.

The boat is normally fitted with a small  outboard motor for docking and maneuvering.

Variants
Santana 2023A
This "standard cabin" model has no mast backstay. It displaces  and carries  of flooding water ballast, which is drained for road transport. The A model has mainsail boom roller furling. It has a PHRF racing average handicap of 224. 
Santana 2023C
This extended coach house "cruising cabin" model has additional headroom and ports and has no mast backstay. It displaces  and carries  of flooding water ballast, which is drained for road transport. The C model has mainsail boom roller furling. The design has sleeping accommodation for four people, with a double "V"-berth in the bow cabin and an aft cabin with a double berth. The galley is located on the starboard side just aft of the bow cabin. The galley is equipped with a single-burner stove, an ice box and a sink. The enclosed head is located on the port side, opposite the galley. The boat has a PHRF racing average handicap of 228. 
Santana 2023R
This "racing" model has a  taller rig of a lighter design, a backstay, a longer cockpit and small cabin and may be equipped with an asymmetrical spinnaker flown from a retractable bowsprit. It also has a 1/2" Divinicell cored hull and deck to reduce weight. The boat has a PHRF racing average handicap of 174.

Operational history
In a 1996 review in Practical Sailor while the boat was in production, Darrell Nicholson wrote, "we think the Santana 2023 is a reasonable introduction to cruising lakes and protected waters. Its simple operation should not confound beginners or those stepping up from daysailing. Though the design of the 2023 is not as radical or sophisticated as other sprit boats such as the Melges 24 or Ultimate 20, the hull is well designed. It is easy to rig and launch. While early models suffered gear failures, Schock appears to be working out the bugs. Still, we are dismayed that at least one customers warranty work has not been completed."

In a 2010 review Steve Henkel wrote, "best features: It is said to be extremely easy to launch and rig the boat for sailing. Worst features: Judging from owner comments, Schock used plywood on the interior of the water ballast tanks on early boats, then turned to fiberglass starting in 1996. However, they continued to use a brittle caulking material for the joints around the top of the tank, which has often led to leaks. Owners have devised various fixes; none sounds easy to accomplish."

See also
List of sailing boat types

References

    

Keelboats
1990s sailboat type designs
Sailing yachts 
Trailer sailers
Sailboat type designs by Steve Schock
Sailboat types built by W. D. Schock Corp